Soucie is a surname. Notable people with the surname include:

Kath Soucie, American actress
Kevin Soucie (born 1954), American politician